Terence Joseph Alexander (11 March 1923 – 28 May 2009) was an English film and television actor, best known for his role as Charlie Hungerford in the British TV drama Bergerac, which ran for nine series on BBC One between 1981 and 1991.

Early life and career
Alexander was born in London, the son of a doctor, and grew up in Yorkshire. He was educated at Ratcliffe College, Leicestershire, and Norwood College, Harrogate, and started acting in the theatre at the age of 16. During the Second World War he served in the British Army as a lieutenant with the 24th Lancers, and was seriously wounded when his armoured car was hit by artillery fire in Italy. In 1956, Alexander appeared on stage in Ring For Catty at the Lyric Theatre in London. He is probably best remembered as Charlie Hungerford from the detective series Bergerac, though he was also very prominent in the 1967 BBC adaptation of The Forsyte Saga. One of his early roles was in the children's series Garry Halliday. He also appeared in one episode of Please Sir in 1970 as the headmaster of a rival school.

Also in 1970, Alexander played Lord Uxbridge in Sergei Bondarchuk's war epic Waterloo.

Alexander appeared in many other film and television roles including three appearances in different roles in The Champions, The Avengers, The Persuaders! (Powerswitch), Terry and June (1979–1980), Behind the Screen (1981–1982), the 1985 Doctor Who serial The Mark of the Rani, and The New Statesman (1987). On radio he starred as The Toff in the BBC radio adaptation of the John Creasey novels. He appeared in all but two episodes of Bergerac from 1981 to 1991. He also played Commander Duffield in the 1985 pilot episode of Dempsey and Makepeace, Armed and Extremely Dangerous.

Alexander appeared on the West End in comedies and farces, and his credits included Move Over Mrs Markham (1971), Two and Two Make Sex (1973), There Goes The Bride (1974–75) and Fringe Benefits (1976).

Personal life
By the time of Bergerac Alexander was blind in one eye due to a condition of the retina, which seriously threatened his sight in the other eye. He retired from acting in 1999, suffering from Parkinson's disease. He lived in Fulham, London, with his second wife, the actress Jane Downs. He died on 28 May 2009 aged 86.

Filmography

Film

 Comin' Thro the Rye (1947) as Robert Burns (film debut)
 The Woman with No Name (1950) as 2nd Sapper Officer
 The Elusive Pimpernel (1950) as Duke of Dorset
 A Tale of Five Cities (1951)
 Death Is a Number (1951) as Alan Robert
 The Gentle Gunman (1952) as Ship's Officer (uncredited)
 Top Secret (1952) as second M.V.D.
 Glad Tidings (1953) as First Lieutenant Spud Cusack
 Park Plaza 605 (1953) as Hotel Manager
 The Runaway Bus (1954) as Peter Jones
 Dangerous Cargo (1954) as Harry Fraser
 The Green Scarf (1954) as Wireless Operator
 Hands of Destiny (1954) as Randal's Office Manager
 Out of the Clouds (1955) as Bob Robins – Duty Room Radio Operator (uncredited)
 Portrait of Alison (1955) as Fenby
 Who Done It? (1956) as Radio Show Official (uncredited)
 The Green Man (1956) as Radio Announcer (uncredited)
 The Eternal Question (1956)
 The One That Got Away (1957) as R.A.F. Intelligence Officer
 The Square Peg (1958) as Captain Wharton
 The Doctor's Dilemma (1958) as Mr. Lanchester
 Danger Within (1959) as Lt. Gibbs
 Breakout (1959) as Farrow
 Don't Panic Chaps! (1959) as Lieutenant Babbington
 The Price of Silence (1960) as John Braine
 The League of Gentlemen (1960) as Rupert
 The Bulldog Breed (1960) as Defending Counsel
 Edgar Wallace Mysteries, (Man at the Carlton Tower) (1961) as Johnny Time
 Carry On Regardless (1961) as Trevor Trelawney
 The Gentle Terror (1961) as David
 The Fast Lady (1962) as Policeman on Motorcycle
 On the Beat (1962) as Chief Supt. Bert Belcher
 She Always Gets Their Man (1962) as Bob Conley
 The Mind Benders (1963) as Rowing Coach (uncredited)
 The V.I.P.s (1963) as Captain
 Bitter Harvest (1963) as Andy
 The Intelligence Men (1965) as Reed
 Judith (1966) as Carstairs
 The Long Duel (1967) as Major
 The Spare Tyres (1967) as Dennis Colville
 Only When I Larf (1968) as Gee Gee Gray
 What's Good for the Goose (1969) as Frisby
 Run a Crooked Mile (1969) as Peter Martin
 The Magic Christian (1969) as Mad Major
 Waterloo (1970) as Lord Uxbridge
 All the Way Up (1970) as Bob Chickman
 The Vault of Horror (1973) as Breedley (Segment 5 "Drawn and Quartered")
 The Day of the Jackal (1973) as Lloyd 
 Claudine (1974) as Teddy (uncredited)
 The Internecine Project (1974) as Business Tycoon
 The Seven Dials Mystery (1981) as George Lomax
 That Englishwoman: An Account of the Life of Emily Hobhouse (1989) as Rev. Reginald Hobhouse (final film)

Television

The New Adventures of Charlie Chan (1958) as Gerald Torrance
Solo for Canary (1958) as Flash 
Garry Halliday (1959-61) as Bill Dodds (co pilot)
The Avengers (1965-1969) as 'Piggy' Warren/Ponsonby/Bromfield
The Forsyte Saga (1967) as Montague Dartie
The Champions (1968) as Douglas Trennick
Bless This House (1971) as Dr. Ian McLaren
 Lord Peter Wimsey (TV series) (The Unpleasantness at the Bellona Club, episode) (1973) as Robert Fentiman
The Pallisers (1974) as Lord George
Jennie: Lady Randolph Churchill (1974) as Henry Ainley
Ike (1979) as Gen. Arthur Tedder
Churchill and the Generals (1979) as Gen. Sir Harold Alexander
Bergerac (1981-1991) as Charlie Hungerford
 Frankenstein (1984) as Alphonse Frankenstein
Strangers and Brothers (1984) as R.S.Robinson
Doctor Who (1985) as Lord Ravensworth 
Casualty (1999) as Laurence Wilkinson (final appearance)

References

External links 
 
 Obituary in The Daily Telegraph
 Obituary in The Guardian
 Obituary in The Independent
 Obituary in The Times – subscribers only
 Obituary in The Scotsman
 Juno Alexander obituary in The Daily Telegraph 1 August 2014

1923 births
2009 deaths
English male film actors
English male radio actors
English male stage actors
English male television actors
People educated at Ratcliffe College
People from Islington (district)
Deaths from Parkinson's disease
Neurological disease deaths in England
Royal Armoured Corps officers
Military personnel from London
British Army personnel of World War II
24th Lancers officers